{{Infobox referendum
| country = Federal State of Austria
| title = Do you agree with the reunification of Austria with the German Reich that was enacted on 13 March 1938 and do you vote for the list of our leader Adolf Hitler?| date        = 10 April 1938
| yes         = 4453912
| no          = 11929
| total       = 4471618
| electorate  = 4484617
| image       = Stimmzettel-Anschluss.jpg
| caption     = Voting ballot of referendum
}}

A referendum on the Anschluss with Germany was held in German-occupied Austria on 10 April 1938, alongside one in Germany. German troops had already occupied Austria one month earlier, on 12 March 1938. The official result was reported as 99.73% in favour, with a 99.71% turnout.

The Austrian government had planned a referendum to assert its sovereignty for 13 March 1938, but Germany invaded Austria the day before in order to prevent the vote taking place.

Political enemies (communists, socialists, etc.) and Austrian citizens of Roma or Jewish origin—roughly 360,000 people or 8% of the Austrian population—were not allowed to vote in the plebiscite.
Background
After the end of World War I, the newly founded Austria claimed sovereignty over the majority German-speaking territory of the former Habsburg empire. According to its provisional constitution it declared to be part of the also newly founded German Republic. Later plebiscites  in Tyrol and Salzburg in 1921, where majorities of 98.77% and 99.11% voted for a unification with Germany, showed that it was also backed by the population.

In September 1919 Austria had to sign the Treaty of Saint Germain, which not only meant significant losses of territory, but also a forced change of name from "German Austria" to "Austria". Furthermore, Article 88 of the treaty stated that "the independence of Austria is inalienable otherwise than with the consent of the Council of the League of Nations", to prevent any attempt to unite with Germany.

Campaign
The referendum was supported by the Social Democratic Party of Austria, whose leader Karl Renner endorsed Hitler on 3 April and Cardinal Theodor Innitzer, the highest representative of the Roman Catholic church in Austria, which meant that about two-thirds of Austrians could be counted on to vote for the Anschluss. However, Innitzer was intimidated into endorsing Anschluss and was assaulted by Nazi supporters, and the Vatican condemned Nazism and forbade Catholics from supporting the Anschluss.

Conduct
The ballots featured a large circle for 'yes' votes and a small one for 'no' votes. This was described as a nudge. Several other claims were made that the vote was rigged. The result was "... the outcome of opportunism, ideological conviction, massive pressure, occasional vote rigging, and a propaganda machine that Austria's political culture had never before experienced." The massive pressure to which people were exposed came from the fact that many were marking the ballot paper in front of the campaign workers in order not to be suspected of voting against the Anschluss. The secrecy of the ballot was in practice non-existent. However, LIFE in 1938 claimed that the results of the referendum and its German counterpart were "largely honest". However, according to the estimates of the Austrian government, with the voting age of 24, about 70 % of Austrians would have voted to preserve the Austrian independence. In case of a fair plebiscite, the Anschluss would have been supported only by 20 % of the Austrian population. According to some Gestapo reports, only a quarter to a third of Austrian voters in Vienna were in favour of the Anschluss'', while in most rural areas, especially in Tyrol, the support for the Anschluss was even lower.

Results
The referendum question was:

After the referendum's approval, Austria was integrated as several administrative divisions into Nazi Germany.

References

Citations

Bibliography

 

1938 elections in Austria
Referendums in Austria
1938 referendums
April 1938 events
Austria under National Socialism